Kergoat is a toponymic surname, and may refer to;

Kergoat derives from the Breton ker which means village or area and koad which means woods.

 - Breton linguist and writer
 - French sociologist, historian and political far-left activist
Danièle Kergoat - French academic and sociologist
 a.k.a. Channig Kergoat - Breton humorist
Yannick Kergoat, French director

Breton-language surnames